The Chowta dynasty was a Jain dynasty that ruled parts of the Tulu Nadu region during the 12th18th centuries.

History
The Chowtas had migrated from North India in probably the 12th century due to Islamic conquests. The succession to the throne was as per the Bunt custom of matrilineal inheritance (Aliyasantana). Their kingdom was very small, containing around only 200 villages, but the land was very fertile.
They initially ruled from their capital at Ullal, which was a very prosperous city and busy centre of trade The first known king of the Dynasty was Tirumalaraya Chowta I (11601179). His successor, Channaraya Chowta I (reign 11791219), moved it inland to the city of Puthige.The principality of Chowta split in 1544, with two separate capitals, one at Ullal, under the renowned Queen Abbakka Chowta, and another at Puttige.

Decline
The Ullal branch seems to have become extinct and  1603, the Chowta moved their capital to Moodabidri. In succeeding years Chowta power had greatly diminished due to invasions by Hyder Ali and Tipu Sultan with whom they signed treaties and also had to give up most of their territory. Chandrasekhara Chikkaraya Chowta V was the last Chowta king who had some authority. He reigned from 1783 to 1822. Following the conquest of South Canara by the British the Chowtas lost all their power except that they received a small pension from the then government. Descendants of the chowta rulers still survive and inhabit the Chowtara Aramane (Chowta Palace) of Moodabidri, which is known for its ornate carvings such as the Nava Nari Kunjara (Nine Damsel Elephant).

See also
Abbakka Chowta, the great Chowta queen who fought the Portuguese colonizers of India.
Alupa dynasty, another dynasty which ruled in Tulu Nadu long before the Chowtas.
List of Jain empires and dynasties
 Chowta

References

External links
 

History of Karnataka
Dynasties of India
Bunt (community)
Jain dynasties